Schlossberg Textil AG are a Swiss manufacturer of bed linen. The company was founded in 1833 and is based in Turbenthal in the Toss Valley and the canton of Zurich.

References

External links 
Schlossberg company web site

Textile companies of Switzerland